Phạm Huỳnh Tam Lang (14 February 1942 – 2 June 2014) was a Vietnamese football player and coach.

References

1942 births
2014 deaths
Vietnamese footballers
Vietnam international footballers
Vietnamese football managers
Association football midfielders
Southeast Asian Games medalists in football
Southeast Asian Games silver medalists for Vietnam
Competitors at the 1967 Southeast Asian Peninsular Games